Qamishlu (also Romanized as Qə
mīshlū and Qamīshlū; also known as Qameshlū and Qomeshlū) is a village in Hamgin Rural District, in the Central District of Dehaqan County, Isfahan Province, Iran. At the 2006 census, its population was 1,687, in 471 families.

References 

Populated places in Dehaqan County